Riffelalp is a railway station on the Gornergrat railway, a rack railway which links the resort of Zermatt with the summit of the Gornergrat.

See also
 List of highest railway stations in Switzerland

References

External links
 

Railway stations in the canton of Valais
Gornergrat Railway stations